Mickelia nicotianifolia is a species of fern in the family Dryopteridaceae, subfamily Elaphoglossoideae. It has a widespread distribution in Central America and northern South America.

Taxonomy
The species was first described by Olof Swartz in 1806 as Acrostichum nicotianifolium. It has since been placed in several other genera, including Mickelia. In 1995, Robbin C. Moran and Benjamin Øllgaard described a new species from Ecuador as Bolbitis riparia. Under this name, it was considered to be endemic to Ecuador and threatened. However, in 2010, Moran et al. treated Bolbitis riparia as a synonym of Mickelia nicotianifolia, a widespread species.

References

riparia
Ferns of the Americas
Taxonomy articles created by Polbot
Taxobox binomials not recognized by IUCN